Oberpfuhl is a lake in Uckermark, Brandenburg, Germany. Its surface area is 0.6965 km². It is located in the town of Lychen.

See also 
Nesselpfuhl
Wurlsee
Zenssee

External links

Lakes of Brandenburg
Uckermark (district)
LOberpfuhl